James Andrew Miller served in the California State Assembly for the 32nd and 22nd district. During World War I he also served in the United States Army.

References

United States Army personnel of World War I
Republican Party members of the California State Assembly
1883 births
1965 deaths
People from Marion County, Oregon